The 25th TCA Awards were presented by the Television Critics Association. Chelsea Handler hosted the ceremony on August 1 at the Langham Huntington Hotel and Spa in Pasadena, Calif.

Winners and nominees

Multiple wins 
The following shows received multiple wins:

Multiple nominations 
The following shows received multiple nominations:

References

External links
Official website
2009 TCA Awards at IMDb.com

2009 television awards
2009 in American television
TCA Awards ceremonies